Joseph Cooper (27 January 1899 – 22 January 1959) was an English footballer who scored 70 goals from 263 appearances in the Football League playing for Sheffield Wednesday, Chesterfield, Notts County, Grimsby Town and Lincoln City. He played non-league football for Sheepbridge Works and Saltley College, and played on trial for West Bromwich Albion. He played as an inside forward.

He joined Notts County from Chesterfield in March 1923 for a £1,000 fee, which was at the time the club's record transfer fee received. During his time with Grimsby Town, Cooper was working as a schoolteacher.

References

1899 births
1959 deaths
Footballers from Chesterfield
English footballers
Association football inside forwards
Sheepbridge Works F.C. players
West Bromwich Albion F.C. players
Sheffield Wednesday F.C. players
Chesterfield F.C. players
Notts County F.C. players
Grimsby Town F.C. players
Lincoln City F.C. players
English Football League players
People from the Borough of Chesterfield
Footballers from Derbyshire